Mozambique made its Paralympic Games début at the 2012 Summer Paralympics in London, sending two visually impaired athletes to compete in track events.

One athlete, Edmilsa Governo, was sent to the 2016 Summer Paralympics where she won a bronze medal.

Mozambique has never taken part in the Winter Paralympic Games, and no Mozambican athlete has ever won a Paralympic medal.

Full results for Mozambique at the Paralympics

See also
 Mozambique at the Olympics

References